James Morgan Sherman (March 6, 1890, Ash Grove, Fairfax County, Virginia – November 5, 1956) was an American professor of bacteriology and dairy industry. He was the president of the American Society for Microbiology in 1937.

Education and career
Sherman attended primary school in Virginia and secondary school in Washington, D.C. He graduated from North Carolina State University with a B.S. in 1911 and from University of Wisconsin–Madison (UWM) with an M.S. in 1912 and with a Ph.D. in bacteriology in 1916. His thesis Studies on soil protozoa and their relation to the bacterial flora was supervised by Edwin George Hastings. Sherman worked as an assistant in bacteriology from 1913 to 1914 at UWM. In 1914, two years before receiving his Ph.D., he left Wisconsin for employment in Pennsylvania. At Pennsylvania State University, he was an instructor from 1914 to 1915 and an assistant professor from 1915 to 1917. From 1917 to 1923 he was a bacteriologist employed by the United States Department of Agriculture. At Cornell University he was a professor and head of the department of dairy industry from 1923 to 1955. At Cornell he held a joint appointment in the department of bacteriology. He was the author or coauthor of more than 100 scientific publications. He did research on streptococci, dairy and food bacteriology, and fermentation.

He was one of the U.S. delegates to the 9th International Dairy Congress held in 1931 in Denmark and delivered a talk on dairy research in Denmark and a talk on dairy research in Kiel. He was the editor-in-chief of the Journal of Bacteriology from 1944 to 1951. From 1947 to 1955 he was a member of the editorial committee of the Annual Review of Microbiology.

Sherman was elected in 1925 a Fellow of the American Association for the Advancement of Science. He was the president of the American Dairy Science Association in 1930. In 1948, he received an honorary doctorate in agriculture from the University of North Carolina. An important cheesemaking, bacterial subspecies, Propionibacterium freudenreichii subsp. shermanii, is named in his honor.

He was a member of the Cosmos Club.

Family
One of his brothers was Henry Clapp Sherman. The Sherman family of Virginia's Ash Grove plantation descended from Philip Sherman, who arrived in the Massachusetts Bay Colony in 1633. In 1916, John Morgan Sherman married Gertrude Hendricks, who died in 1918. In 1928 he married Katherine Keiper. He was the father of three children.

Selected publications

References

1890 births
1956 deaths
American bacteriologists
American food scientists
Dairy educators
North Carolina State University alumni
University of Wisconsin–Madison alumni
Cornell University faculty
Fellows of the American Association for the Advancement of Science